is a Japanese light novel series written by Shirow Shiratori, with illustrations by Kippu. A 12-episode anime television series adaptation by Silver Link aired from January to March 2014. Funimation streamed the series on their video website.

Plot
The sudden retirement of the famous idol Yuka Kusakabe from the entertainment business shocks the world and devastates her biggest fan, a teenager named Kosaku Hata. His classmates at the Tamo Agriculture School manage to get him out of his depression and bring him out of his room to attend his classes. However, as he does, Kusakabe enters their class under the name Ringo Kinoshita as a transfer student. Kosaku realizes he has a once-in-a-lifetime opportunity to get to personally know his dream girl. With his group of friends, and under the persuasion of his teacher, he tries to find out why she came to the agricultural school.

Characters

Class representative of 2-A class. His parents had decided to move to Aioi and become farmers when he was very little, but the failure of the family's first crop left them in debt and caused the family to fracture, with his mother having to work part-time and his father continuously leaving town to find work. Eventually, his mother became sick and died, after which his father left town for good and abandoned him. Afterward, he was raised by Minori's family. Kosaku idolizes Yuka Kusakabe, whom he sees as a symbol for a life in the city that he desperately craves. He enrolled in an agriculture school just so he can send his grown vegetables anonymously to her, and is devastated upon hearing of her retirement. He is surprised, however, when he discovers that his idol has become his classmate, albeit under another name and as a seemingly different person. He is somehow oblivious to Minori's feelings for him despite the fact that he gets flustered by any suggestive language from her. It also appears that Ringo has feelings for Kōsaku, since she gets seemingly jealous over suggestive stories about him and Minori. He also prefers feet more than breasts.
 

An idol who previously performed under the stage name . She unexpectedly retires from show business and enrolls herself at the Tamo Agricultural school. Unlike her idol persona, she, as Ringo, is more reserved and quiet. She is somewhat a rival of Minori for what seems to be Kōsaku's affection (she has called Minori a "Fat Ass" and a "Meddling Bug" in the third episode while competing to plant rice in a rice field), yet they end up on good terms after the incident. She appears to be conscious of her slender figure as the mention of her having small breasts or being called "flat" can make her violently angry. It is eventually revealed that Ringo came to the school because Minori wrote her a letter about Kosaku, which caused her to fall in love with him. She confesses her feelings to him in the eighth novel, and they begin dating.

 Kōsaku's childhood best friend. She has a major crush on Kōsaku and her over-protectiveness shot up with Ringo's arrival. She even challenged her in episode 3 to a series of contests because of that. Though after what seems to be their "fight" on the rice (she called Ringo a "Thieving Cat" during that time), they seem to be friendly with each other. She speaks with a Mino dialect. She is revealed to be very ticklish in episode 4. She mentioned that Kosaku often stayed with her (as he had no mother and his father was always out) and took baths with her and her three sisters until eighth grade, much to Rintarō's envy.

 A friend of Kōsaku and Minori. At times he is analytical, but he is notorious for wearing mankinis whenever water is involved. He also rides a goat he calls Yakul, though its real name hasn't been revealed yet. He is the son of the owner of a big agricultural company--to whom he lost in an agricultural sale showdown, prompting him to go abroad for the seminar he was offered. He had a falling out with his father due to the latter using chemicals in his farming methods that his wife, Kei's mother, was terribly sensitive to and contributed to her early death. This is the reason behind Kei's desire to farm only organic goods without the use of chemicals, such as pesticides. He reveals in episode 10 that he asked his aunt to adopt him after his falling out with his father, which explains why his surname is Kamatori and not Menjō.

International student from Texas.

She majors in animal husbandry. She is shown to have a crush towards Kei, but she denies it in front of others. She switches from a proud, stern personality to a timid, stuttering one when she feels embarrassed or shy. A recurring gag in the series is that people tend to mention and/or emphasize her great bust size and harass her for it, much (mostly) to her embarrassment. She later accompanies Kei to a seminar abroad that both of them were invited to.

Class representative of 2-B class and one of the Shitennō, "Bio Suzuki". An expert in biotechnology, and has invented a yogurt culture that one can just apply--partly using it as a means to justify her bukkake fetish by having Kosaku and Kei shoot each other with it. She is usually dressed in a Gothic Lolita outfit. Like Kanegami, she tends to go with the flow of the other Shitennō.

Class representative of 2-D class and one of the Shitennō, "Money Kanegami". A master of anything related to making money by all means necessary--even to the point of getting suspended; but considers it fun. She also tends to go with the flow of the other Shitennō. She is known for her flashy earrings (The signs for the Dollar and Yen).

Class representative of 2-E class and one of the Shitennō, "Rose Hanazono". He is an expert in the art of landscaping, but Kōsaku is kind of at odds with him for making a pass at Minori despite his gender preference. His true inclination was revealed when he invited over Ringo under the pretense of luring Kōsaku. He was able to successfully kiss him by taking advantage of the fact that Kōsaku is not aware of what sex he is really into even though Kei stormed in to warn him. Kei warned Kōsaku to late.

Class representative of 2-F class and one of the Shitennō, "Woodman Rintarō". He has mastery of the forestry trade, but he is fiercely jealous of the fact that there are two attractive girls close to Kōsaku; and is desperate to, at least, have a girl sit beside him (all due to the fact that there are no girls in his class). Although Kōsaku mentioned that his class once had a female classmate, Rintarō angrily states that she ran away after one day. It is stated that he is weak against love triangles.

Also known as "Becky," she is the Homeroom teacher of 2-A class. Because of her mood swings in her class, she has this trait of suddenly plunging the entire class into despair. Despite her young looks and demeanor, she is forty years old. A running gag involves Bekki and Kōsaku in hilarious situations such as telling her that it's okay to do "it" since it's him. She is desperate to get married, and this desperation results in her erratic, near-hysterical behavior, especially when the very subject of it is brought up, and often gets jealous of younger girls. It is also mentioned the only reason she has not yet been fired for her inappropriate behavior is because her father is an important politician.

Principal of Tamo Agriculture School who Kōsaku claims once killed a bear with his bare hands.

President of Hexa Techs Corporation and the biological father of Kei Kamatori who he bests in a produce selling contest in episode 10. He and Kei had a falling out due to him continuously using chemicals in his farming methods that his wife was terribly sensitive to which contributed to her early death. He is a sharp businessman who Kei claims always has his eye on the bottom line. Unlike his son, he believes that using modern technology in farming produces better results than organically grown goods.

Media

Light Novel
No-Rin began as a light novel series written by Shirow Shiratori and illustrated by Kippu.

Manga
The direct manga adaptation illustrated by Maru Asakura and cooperated by Yoko Matsu'ura is being serialized on Square Enix's Young Gangan Comics starting from March 16, 2012. Another manga adaptation titled , which more focuses on the comedy, being serialized by Kotoji by August 24, 2013 on Square Enix's Big Gangan.

Drama CD
A drama CD adaptation was released by HOBiRECORDS on April 27, 2012.

Anime
A 12-episode anime television series adaptation by Silver Link was broadcast in Japan from January 10 to March 29, 2014.

In North America, the series was licensed for English release by Funimation. Crunchyroll also added the series for its streaming service.

Episode list

Reception
Anime News Network had three editors review the first episode of the anime: Carl Kimlinger found the overarching romance to be "awful" and "cosmically unlikely", and the use of agriculture as a background setting pales in comparison to shows like Moyashimon and Silver Spoon; Rebecca Silverman commended the subtle transformation of Yuka into her alter-ego Ringo but felt the humor was either "not humorous or downright offensive" because of Kosaku and the supporting cast, concluding that the show's fish out of water romance plot has potential but might not be worth waiting after several episodes. The third reviewer, Theron Martin, said about the episode overall: "Technical merits are respectable, including an impressively show series-opening song, but how Ringo is handled going forward is the much more potentially interesting aspect and will ultimately determine the success or failure of the series." Martin reviewed the complete anime series in 2016. He gave praise to the various comedic aspects it delivers along with some heartwarming moments through a "solid but not exceptional visual" palette, but felt that put together it makes for some underwritten storytelling in its "weak and inconsistent love triangle", concluding that: "No-Rin may not come together well, but that does not keep it from being quite entertaining. Be aware going in that it's not as tame as first impressions might suggest and it can be a fun viewing experience."

See also
The Ryuo's Work Is Never Done!, another light novel series by the same author

References

External links
Anime official website 
Light novel official website 

2011 Japanese novels
Agriculture and farming in anime and manga
Anime and manga based on light novels
Funimation
GA Bunko
Gangan Comics manga
Japanese idols in anime and manga
Light novels
Novels set in Gifu Prefecture
Romantic comedy anime and manga
School life in anime and manga
Seinen manga
Silver Link
Square Enix franchises